In Buddhism, vitarka (Sanskrit (वितर्क); Pali: vitakka), "applied thought,"(initial) inquiry," and vicāra (Sanskrit (विचार) and Pali), "investigating what has been focused on by vitakka, are qualities or elements of the first dhyāna or jhāna.

In the Pali canon, Vitakka-vicāra form one expression, which refers to directing one's thought or attention on an object (vitarka) and investigating it (vicāra), "breaking it down into its functional components" to understand it [and] distinguishing the multitude of conditioning factors implicated in a phenomenal event."

The later Theravada commentarial tradition, as represented by Buddhaghosa's Visuddhimagga, interprets vitarka and vicāra as the initial and sustained application of attention to a meditational object, which culminates in the stilling of the mind. According to Fox and Bucknell vitarka-vicāra may also refer to "the normal process of discursive thought," which is quieted through absorption in the second jhāna.

Etymology
Vitarka (Sanskrit: वितर्क ) - "thoughts," "applied thought," "applied attention," "inquiry," "initial inquiry," "initial mental application, or initial intellectual investigative intent." Its roots are:
 वि vi, a prefix to verbs and nouns it expresses;
 तर्क tarka, "reasoning, inquiry."
Vitarka may refer to mental activities that are manifest both in normal consciousness and in the first stage of dhyana. According to Buswel and Lopez, in general, it means "thought," "applied thought," or "distracted thoughts." According to Bhikkhu Bodhi, "In the Suttas, the word Vittaka is often used in the loose sense of thought, but in the Abhidhamma it is used in a precise technical sense to mean the mental factor that mounts or directs the mind towards an object."

Vicāra (Sanskrit: विचार) - "investigation," "subsequent discursive reasoning and thought, i.e., investigating what has been focused on by vitakka." Its roots are:
 वि vi, a prefix to verbs and nouns it expresses;
 चर् car, to move, roam, obtain knowledge of.

Vitarka investigates things roughly, while vicāra investigates things exactly. According to Dan Lusthaus, it is

Mental factors in meditation

Vitarka and vicāra are two of the mental factors (cetasika) present during the first dhyāna (Pali: jhāna), and which are absent in the higher jhanas. According to Shankman, "two distinct meanings are suggested [...] one indicating mental activities such as thinking, reflecting, and so on, and the other referring to the mental activity of connecting and sustaining the attention on a meditation object."

Investigation
According to Dan Lusthaus, vitarka-vicāra is analytic scrutiny, a form of prajna. It "involves focusing on [something] and then breaking it down into its functional components" to understand it, "distinguishing the multitude of conditioning factors implicated in a phenomenal event."

According to Polak, in the Pali Canon vitarka and vicāra are mostly related to thinking about the sense-impressions, which give rise to further egoistical thought and action. The stilling of this thinking fits into the Buddhist training of sense-withdrawal and right effort, culminating in the equanimity and mindfulness of dhyana-practice.

Ulrich Timme Kragh explains vitarka (discernment) and vicāra (discursiveness), as understood by the Yogācārabhūmi-Śāstra, thus: discernment is "the cognitive operation that is responsible for ascertaining what is perceived by the senses by initially labeling it with a name", while discursiveness is "the subsequent conceptual operation of deciding whether the perceived sense-object is desirable and what course of action one might want to take in relation to it".

According to Chaicen, "Samadhi with general examination and specific in-depth investigation means getting rid of the not virtuous dharmas, such as greedy desire and hatred, to stay in joy and pleasure caused by nonarising, and to enter the first meditation and fully dwell in it."

Commentatorial tradition
According to Stuart-Fox, the Abhidhamma separated vitarka from vicāra, and ekaggatā (onepointedness) was added to the description first jhāna to give an equal number of five hindrances and five antidotes. The commentarial tradition regards the qualities of the first jhāna to be antidotes to the five hindrances, and ekaggatā may have been added to the first jhāna to give exactly five anti-dotes for the five hindrances.

While initially simply referring to thought, which is present at the onset of dhyāna, the terms vitarka and vicāra were re-interpreted by the developing Abhidharma and commentarial tradition. In Theravāda, vitarka is one of the mental factors that apprehend the quality of an object. It is the "initial application of attention" or the mind to its object,  while vicāra is the sustained application of the mind on an object. Vitarka is regarded in the Theravāda tradition as an antidote for thina-middha (sloth and torpor), one of the five hindrances.

Normal process of discursive thought
According to Roderick S. Bucknell, "vitakka-vicāra, the factor that particularly characterizes the first jhāna, is probably nothing other than the normal process of discursive thought, the familiar but usually unnoticed stream of mental imagery and verbalization".

Martin Stuart-Fox explains, referring to Rhys Davids and Stede, when vitarka-vicāra are mentioned in tandem, they are one expression, "to cover all varieties of thinking, including sustained and focused thought. It is thinking in this inclusive sense that the meditator suppresses through concentration when he attains one-ness of mind and thus moves from first to second jhāna".

Yogacara
The Yogacara term manas means both "intentionality" or 'self-centered thinking', and "discriminative thinking" (vikalpa). The process of meditation aims at "non-thinking," stopping both these cognitive processes.

Vitarka Mudrā
The Vitarka mudrā, "mudra of discussion," expresses vitarka, joining the tips of the thumb and the index together, and keeping the other fingers straight.

See also
 Mental factors (Buddhism)
 Sananda Samadhi

Notes

References

Sources

External links
Mahāyāna tradition:
 Ranjung Yeshe wiki entry for rtog pa

Theravāda tradition:
 Applied thinking and sustained thinking, Nina van Gorkom
 Definition of vitakka, Pali Text Society, Rhys Davids & Stede (1921-25)

Meditation
Mental factors in Buddhism